Homoroselaps is a genus of venomous snakes of the family Atractaspididae.

Species
 Homoroselaps dorsalis (Smith, 1849)
 Homoroselaps lacteus (Linnaeus, 1758)

References

Homoroselaps
Snake genera
Taxonomy articles created by Polbot